Suh Chung-won (Korean: 서청원; Hanja: 徐淸源; born 3 April 1943) is a South Korean politician who served as a member of the National Assembly for eight terms(1981-1985, 1988-2004, 2013–2020) and floor Leader of the Our Republican Party. Suh has been in the National Assembly for 32 years, being second most-elected member.

Early life and education 
Suh was born in South Chungcheong Province, Japanese Korea on April 3, 1943. He graduated from Chungang University with a degree in political science. He actively took part in the June 3 Resistance Movement in 1964. He served in South Korea's mandatory military conscription from December 1966 to October 1969; he served for 34 months in the South Korean military. After serving his time in the military, Suh worked as a reporter for the Chosun Ilbo until 1980. During his time as a reporter, he reported from the front lines of the Gwangju Uprising in 1980.

Political career

Representative of Dongjak-gu (1981-2004) 
Suh ran for the Seoul 11th electoral district (now Dongjak-gu A) as a member of the Democratic Korea Party in the 1981 South Korean legislative election. He was elected along with Cho Jong-ho of the ruling Democratic Justice Party. He ran for the same electoral district in 1985, however he wasn't elected.

Suh ran for the Dongjak-gu A electoral district as a member of the Reunification Democratic Party in 1988 and was elected. Since his election in 1988, Suh continuously won until 2004. He was ineligible to participate in the 2004 South Korean legislative election and 2008 South Korean legislative election due to him receiving illegal funds for his campaign previously.

Pro-Park Geun-hye politician (2007-present) 
He supported Park Geun-hye becoming the presidential nominee of the Grand National Party national convention in 2007, however Lee Myung-bak was nominated. As a result, Suh created the Future Hope Alliance; a solely pro-Park Geun-hye party in 2010 as his relations with pro-Lee Myung-bak members of the Grand National Party deteriorated.

Later, the Future Hope Alliance was absorbed back into the Saenuri Party (formerly Grand National Party) in 2012.

Suh ran for the Hwaseong A electoral district during by-elections in 2013 and was elected. Suh served as acting Speaker of the National Assembly until Chung Sye-kyun was elected to the position.

After the impeachment of Park Geun-hye in 2017, he remained pro-Park Geun-hye which made him unpopular with the anti-Park Geun-hye faction of Saenuri Party. He regularly participates in pro-Park rallies along with Cho Won-jin.

He joined the Liberty Republican Party on March 21, 2020 and became the Floor Leader of the party. He plans to run in the upcoming 2020 South Korean legislative election.

Personal life 
Suh married his wife Lee Seon-hwa in 1969. Together they have a son and a daughter.

References

External links 
Suh Chung-won official profile (National Assembly of the Republic of Korea)

1943 births
Living people
Members of the National Assembly (South Korea)
South Korean journalists
Chung-Ang University alumni
People from South Chungcheong Province
Government ministers of South Korea